Bartholomä is a municipality in the German state of Baden-Württemberg, in Ostalbkreis district.

Bartholomä is mainly a commuter town in the historical region of Swabia, that straddles the border between Baden-Württemberg and Bavaria.

The language spoken in Bartholomä is the Swabian dialect.

The businesses in Bartholomä are mainly German staples: a couple of bakeries and butcher shops, a local bar and grill called Zum Schwarzen Adler (the local resource for traditional German food) and its sister establishment, a medieval-themed venue for wedding banquets and such called Braighausen. There is also a complex of houses on the outskirts of town collectively called Amalienhof.

Bartholomä is a 35-minute drive from Neresheim, home of the Neresheim Abbey.

References

Ostalbkreis
Württemberg